"Hello" is a song by Australian DJs and producers Stafford Brothers, which features Young Money Entertainment's Lil Wayne and Christina Milian. It was released as a single in the United States on 18 December 2012, and Australia on 4 January 2013.

The single was certified double platinum in Australia and hit number 1 on the Australian artist singles chart, dance chart, club chart and iTunes dance chart. It peaked at number 4 on the overall singles chart, spending 20 weeks inside the top 50. A remix package was released internationally on Beatport in which two of the remixes reached number 1 in their respective genres. "Hello" was the Stafford Brothers' first US release.

Music video
The video for "Hello" was released on the Stafford Brothers' VEVO account on 24 May 2013. The video features Christina Milian and Lil Wayne, and was directed by Yasha Malekzad.

The setting is a pool party and features both Milian and Lil Wayne along with blow-up and real kangaroos.

Charts

Weekly charts

Year-end charts

Certification

Accolades
"Hello" was nominated for Song of the Year at the 2013 ARIA Music Awards; however, it lost to "Resolution" by Matt Corby.

References

2012 debut singles
2012 songs
2013 singles
Cash Money Records singles
Christina Milian songs
Lil Wayne songs
Songs written by Alex James (songwriter)
Songs written by Christina Milian
Songs written by Harry Sommerdahl
Songs written by Whitney Phillips
Stafford Brothers songs